Bill Miller (4 January 1936 – 27 June 1986) was an Australian rules footballer who played with Geelong in the Victorian Football League (VFL).

On 6 July 1963 he was a member of the Geelong team that were comprehensively and unexpectedly beaten by Fitzroy, 9.13 (67) to 3.13 (31) in the 1963 Miracle Match.

See also
 1963 Miracle Match

Notes

External links 

1936 births
1986 deaths
Australian rules footballers from New South Wales
Geelong Football Club players